The 2018–19 Indian Women's League final round was played between twelve teams divided into two groups to decide the champion of Indian Women's League third season. It was played between 5 and 22 May at the Guru Nanak Stadium in Ludhiana.

Teams

Group stage

Cluster I

Table

Matches

Cluster II

Table

Matches

Knock–out stage
Top two teams from each group progressed to the semifinals, played on 20 May before the final which was held on 22 May.

Bracket

Semi-finals

Final

Statistics

Top scorers

Hat-tricks 
Result column shows goal tally of player's team first.

Season awards
Hero Indian Women's League 2018–19 awards.

References

External links
 Fixtures and results

Indian Women's League
2018–19 in Indian football leagues
2018–19 domestic women's association football leagues